The Khan Bathhouse (Persian: حمام خان) is a Qajar era public bath in Sanandaj, Iran. It was built in 1805 by the order of  Amanollah Khan Ardalan, and was later repaired in 1878.

It was listed in the national heritage sites of Iran with the number 2603 on 15 March, 2000.

See also 

 Qajar Bathhouse

References 

Public baths in Iran
Buildings of the Qajar period
Buildings and structures in Kurdistan Province
Tourist attractions in Kurdistan Province
19th-century establishments in Iran
National works of Iran